Andoma, formerly called Liénart, is a village in the Bas-Uélé province of the Democratic Republic of the Congo. It was a junction on the defunct Vicicongo line, a railway.

Location

Andoma is in the Bas-Uélé province, Democratic Republic of the Congo.
It is to the east of Buta and to the south of Titulé.
It is in the Titulé Health Zone.

Former railway

Andoma was formerly called Liénart after Commander Liénart, who was responsible for the Buta-Andoma section of the Vicicongo railway, and the Andoma-Titulé branch.
The  section from Buta to Titulé via Andoma (Liénart) opened on 11 November 1932, built by the Société des Chemins de Fer Vicinaux du Congo.
Colonel Paulis supervised work on the section from Andoma to Mungbere via Isiro (formerly called Paulis).
The  section of this line from Andoma to Zobia was opened in December 1932.

Notes

Sources

Populated places in Bas-Uélé